我只是想要 is Kelvin Tan()'s debut solo album in Singapore.

Track listing

Original CD Edition
The original edition of the disc was released on 11 January 2006 in Singapore and 26 January 2006 in Malaysia.

CD1 (Today)
The first disc of the album, named "Today", features Kelvin Tan's 4 new songs and his covers of some songs he had sung before in Project SuperStar Season 1 (2005).
 我只是想要 All I Want Is...
 爱.恨.难 Love . Hate
 朋友 一直都在 Forever Friends
 触摸 Touch
 孤单的夜里我不孤单 (2006 年新版本) Lonely Night I'm Not Lonely
 火柴天堂 (2006 年新版本) Matchstick Heaven
 我真的受伤了 (2006 年新版本) Truly Hurt
 走出黑暗的世界 (2006 年新版本) Out Of The Darkness
 Heaven Knows (2006 年新版本)
 童话 (2006 年新版本) Fable
 其实你不懂我的心 (2006 年新版本) You Don't Know My Heart

CD2 (Yesterday)
The second disc of the album, named "Yesterday", features Kelvin Tan's cover of famous old Chinese songs.
 月亮代表我的心 Moon Represents My Heart
 一剪梅 Plum Blossom
 外婆的澎湖湾 Grandma's Bay

CD+MV VCD Edition
This second edition of the album did not contain the "Yesterday" disc as in the original CD edition but instead in its place is a VCD containing Music Videos of the first five tracks of the album

CD
 我只是想要 All I Want Is...
 爱.恨.难 Love . Hate (伟联首部电视剧[梦拼图]片尾曲)
 朋友 一直都在 Forever Friends (伟联首部电视剧[梦拼图]片尾曲)
 触摸 Touch (感人电视剧[星闪闪]主题曲)
 孤单的夜里我不孤单 (2006 年新版本) Lonely Night I'm Not Lonely
 火柴天堂 (2006 年新版本) Matchstick Heaven
 我真的受伤了 (2006 年新版本) Truly Hurt
 走出黑暗的世界 (2006 年新版本) Out Of The Darkness
 Heaven Knows (2006 年新版本)
 童话 (2006 年新版本) Fable
 其实你不懂我的心 (2006 年新版本) You Don't Know My Heart

VCD
 我只是想要 All I Want Is...
 触摸 Touch
 爱.恨.难 Love . Hate
 朋友 一直都在 Forever Friends
 孤单的夜里我不孤单 (2006 年新版本) Lonely Night I'm Not Lonely

All I Want Is... Singing Karaoke
我只是想要...唱卡拉OK (English; All I Want Is... Singing Karaoke) contains a VCD of the karaoke videos of some songs in All I Want Is...
 我只是想要 All I Want Is...
 爱.恨.难 Love . Hate (伟联首部电视剧[梦拼图]片尾曲)
 朋友 一直都在 Forever Friends (伟联首部电视剧[梦拼图]片尾曲)
 触摸 Touch (感人电视剧[星闪闪]主题曲)
 孤单的夜里我不孤单 Lonely Night I'm Not Lonely
 火柴天堂 Matchstick Heaven
 Heaven Knows
 我真的受伤了 Truly Hurt
 月亮代表我的心 Moon Represents My Heart
 其实你不懂我的心 (Live 版本) You Don't Know My Heart (Live)

Achievements

 10,000 copies sold on day of inception (January 11, 2006)
 15,000 copies of the album sold within 5 days of inception in Singapore (Platinum Award)
 Double Platinum Award in Singapore
 Touch won "Best Theme Song" in Singapore's Star Awards 2006

Kelvin Tan albums
2007 albums